Kharkara   is a village of Rohtak district, Haryana, India. It is a part of Meham Choubisi.

Jaideep Ahlawat, the Bollywood actor, was born here.

See also
 Meham

References

This village is known for its brotherhood. All caste people live in this village. A famous Shyoth Nath Temple is situated in this village. This village is also known as the soil of martyrs.
Villages in Rohtak district